Diane Joyce Humetewa (Help:IPA/English born December 5, 1964) is a United States district judge of the United States District Court for the District of Arizona and was the United States Attorney for the District of Arizona, serving in that position from December 2007 to August 2009. Confirmed in 2014 as the first Native American woman and enrolled tribal member to serve as a federal judge, Humetewa, a Hopi, is one of six Native Americans in history to serve in this position. Humetewa is also a Professor of Practice at Arizona State University's Sandra Day O'Connor College of Law. Humetewa has served as counsel to the Senate Committee on Indian Affairs and to the Deputy Attorney General for the United States Department of Justice, as a member of the United States Sentencing Guideline Commission, Native American Advisory Committee, and as an Appellate Court Judge for the Hopi Tribe, of which she is an enrolled member.

Early life, education, and legal career
Humetewa was born in 1964 in Phoenix, Arizona. She is Native American and is an enrolled member of the Hopi tribe. She earned an associate degree from Phoenix College in 1985, then graduated from Arizona State University in 1987 with a Bachelor of Science. From 1987 to 1990, Humetewa worked as a victim advocate for the U.S. Attorney's Office for the Arizona federal judicial district. She then attended Arizona State's Sandra Day O'Connor College of Law, graduating in 1993 with a Juris Doctor. 

From 1993 to 1996, Humetewa was a deputy counsel for the U.S. Senate's Committee on Indian Affairs. Beginning in 1996, she served as the Tribal Liaison in the office of the United States Attorney for Arizona. From 2001 to 2007, she served there as Senior Litigation Counsel. In January 2007 Humetewa was recommended as a United States attorney by both of Arizona's senators, John McCain and Jon Kyl, nominated by President George W. Bush in November, and was confirmed by the United States Senate and sworn in as the United States Attorney for the District of Arizona on December 17, 2007.  The investiture for Humetewa was held on February 6, 2008 at the Sandra Day O'Connor Courthouse in Phoenix. She is the first Native American woman to serve as a United States Attorney.

Humetewa was the permanent successor to Paul K. Charlton, whose dismissal on December 7, 2006 was a prominent aspect of the dismissal of U.S. attorneys controversy in the Bush administration in early 2007. Daniel G. Knauss served as interim United States Attorney for one year after Charlton's dismissal. During that period, Knauss and Humetewa continued to pursue the criminal investigation of Congressman Rick Renzi (R-AZ), begun by Charlton in September 2006. Renzi was indicted by the United States Attorney's office on February 22, 2008.

A graduate of the Indian Legal Program at the ASU college of law, Humetewa is considered a national expert on Native American legal issues; she has instructed law enforcement and prosecutors on this topic. From 2002 to 2007, she served as a judge pro tem on the Hopi Tribal Appellate Court, and as an ad hoc member of the Native American Subcommittee of the United States Sentencing Commission. Humetewa resigned effective August 2, 2009 when President Barack Obama nominated Dennis K. Burke as the next United States Attorney for the District of Arizona. She was appointed in 2011 as ASU's Special Advisor to the university president for American Indian Affairs and Special Counsel in the Office of General Counsel at ASU.

Federal judicial service

On September 19, 2013, President Barack Obama nominated Humetewa to serve as a United States District Judge of the United States District Court for the District of Arizona, to the seat vacated by Judge Mary H. Murguia, who was elevated to the United States Court of Appeals for the Ninth Circuit on January 4, 2011. Humetewa was one of four Arizona judicial nominees announced by Obama that day who were chosen in consultation with Republican senators John McCain and Jeff Flake. On February 27, 2014 her nomination was reported out of the Senate Judiciary committee. On May 12, 2014 Senate Majority Leader Harry Reid filed for cloture on the nomination. On Wednesday May 14, 2014 the United States Senate invoked cloture on her nomination by a 64–34 vote. Later that day her nomination was confirmed by a 96–0 vote, with three Democrats and 1 Republican not voting. She received her judicial commission on May 16, 2014.

2016 and 2020 United States Supreme Court vacancies
Following the death of Justice Antonin Scalia in February 2016, Humetewa was mentioned as a possible consensus nominee for a vacancy on the United States Supreme Court, considered able to make it through the Republican-controlled Senate.

In early 2020, it was revealed that Humetewa was on President Donald Trump's shortlist of prospective nominees should a vacancy open up on the Court. Ruth Bader Ginsburg died on September 18, 2020, and the nomination eventually went to Indiana's Amy Coney Barrett.

Personal life
Humetewa is an enrolled member of the Hopi Nation. She is the daughter of Donald A. and Ella Mary Humetewa, and is married to Miguel Juarez. As of October 2021, she is the fourth Native-American federal judge actively serving on the bench.

See also
Barack Obama Supreme Court candidates
Donald Trump Supreme Court candidates
List of first women lawyers and judges in Arizona
List of first women lawyers and judges in the United States
List of Native American jurists

References

External links

1964 births
Living people
20th-century American lawyers
20th-century American women lawyers
20th-century Native American women
20th-century Native Americans
21st-century American judges
21st-century American lawyers
21st-century American politicians
21st-century American women lawyers
21st-century Native American women
21st-century Native Americans
21st-century American women judges
Arizona Republicans
Arizona State University faculty
Assistant United States Attorneys
Hopi people
Judges of the United States District Court for the District of Arizona
Native American judges
Native American lawyers
Native American women in politics
Phoenix College alumni
Sandra Day O'Connor College of Law alumni
United States Attorneys for the District of Arizona
United States district court judges appointed by Barack Obama